The Cañasgordas Fault is an oblique thrust fault in the department of Antioquia in northwestern Colombia.

Etymology 
The fault is named after the town of Cañasgordas.

Description 
The Cañasgordas Fault is located to the northwest of the city of Medellín. The fault traverses most of the Western Ranges of the Colombian Andes between the towns of Dabeiba and Giraldo in the department of Antioquia. The Cañasgordas Fault probably joins the Mutatá Fault. The fault displaces Cretaceous sedimentary and volcanic rocks, Tertiary sedimentary rocks, and Quaternary mud flows. The fault forms strong linear features on satellite images and aerial photographs and controls the course of the Río Sucio, which has a prominent, linear V-shaped valley. Fault scarps are formed on Quaternary mud flows.

See also 

 List of earthquakes in Colombia
 Romeral Fault System

References

Bibliography

Maps

Further reading 
 

Seismic faults of Colombia
Thrust faults
Strike-slip faults
Inactive faults
Faults